Antonio Peña may refer to:

Antonio Peña Díaz (born 1936), Mexican biochemist who received the Carlos J. Finlay Prize for Microbiology (UNESCO, 2003)
Antonio Peña (1951 – 2006), Mexican professional wrestling promoter
Antonio Francisco Peña Padilla, also known as "Tony Peña": former Dominican catcher at Major League Baseball

Antonio Pena
Antonio Pena (1894-1947), Uruguayan sculptor

See also

 Tony Peña (disambiguation)
 Antoni Peña (born 1970), Spanish marathon runner